China participated at the 2017 Summer Universiade in Taipei, Taiwan with 108 competitors in 9 sports.

Competitors
The following table lists China's delegation per sport and gender.

Medal summary

Athletics

Men

Track Events

Field Events

Women

Track Events

Field Events

Combined Events

Heptathlon

Fencing

Gymnastics

Rhythmic
Individual

Group

Roller Sports

Swimming

Men

Women

Table Tennis

Taekwondo

Weightlifting

Wushu

Sanda

Taolu

See also
China at the Universiade

References

External links
NUSF Overview - China

Nations at the 2017 Summer Universiade
2017 in Chinese sport
China at the Summer Universiade